Lars Erik Eriksen (born 29 December 1954) is a retired Norwegian cross-country skier who competed in multiple events at the 1980 and 1984 Olympics and 1978 and 1982 World Championships. He had his best achievements in the 4 × 10 km relay, winning a bronze in 1978, a silver in 1980 and a gold in 1982, and finishing in fourth place at the 1984 Olympic Games. Individually, he performed better in longer distances, winning two medals in the 30 and 50 km at the 1982 World Championships and finishing fourth in the 50 km at the 1980 Olympic Games, though he also won the 1984 World Cup in the 15 km event. Eriksen retired in 1988, and later worked as a skiing coach, with Bjørn Dæhlie among others.

Eriksen was awarded the Holmenkollen medal in 1984 (shared with Jacob Vaage and Armin Kogler).

Cross-country skiing results
All results are sourced from the International Ski Federation (FIS).

Olympic Games
 1 medal – (1 silver)

World Championships
 4 medals – (1 gold, 1 silver, 2 bronze)

World Cup

Season standings

Individual podiums
1 victory 
4 podiums

Team podiums

 1 victory  
 1 podium 

Note:  Until the 1999 World Championships, World Championship races were included in the World Cup scoring system.

References

 
 
 Holmenkollen medalists – click Holmenkollmedaljen for downloadable pdf file 
 Holmenkollen winners since 1892 – click Vinnere for downloadable pdf file

External links
 

1954 births
Cross-country skiers at the 1980 Winter Olympics
Cross-country skiers at the 1984 Winter Olympics
FIS Nordic World Ski Championships medalists in cross-country skiing
Holmenkollen medalists
Holmenkollen Ski Festival winners
Living people
Medalists at the 1980 Winter Olympics
Norwegian male cross-country skiers
Olympic cross-country skiers of Norway
Olympic medalists in cross-country skiing
Olympic silver medalists for Norway
Skiers from Oslo